Kenneth R. Wendt (January 29, 1910 – January 19, 1982) was an American football player, jurist, and politician.

Wendt was a guard for the Chicago Cardinals of the National Football League in 1932. He then served in the Illinois General Assembly and as a judge in Cook County, Illinois.

Early life and career
Wendt was born in Chicago and graduated DePaul Academy High School.
 He played college football at Marquette University. After graduation, he earned a spot with the Chicago Cardinals during the 1932 NFL season.

Political career
He retired from the game after the 1932 season in order to study law at John Marshall Law School. Wendt served as a member of the Illinois House of Representatives from 1952 to 1962, as a Democrat, when he was elected to the Cook County bench. He served as Chief Judge of the Narcotics Division of the Criminal Courts and then as judge of the Criminal Court for the Cook County Circuit Court.

A lifelong Chicagoan, Wendt died in Chicago on January 19, 1982.

Awards and honors
Wendt Playlot Park, a children's playlot in Chicago, is named in Wendt's honor.

Personal life
Wendt's daughter, Mary Jane Theis, is a justice of the Illinois Supreme Court.

References

External links
 
 1929 – Marquette University Football Team
 1930 – Marquette University Football Team

1910 births
1982 deaths
Players of American football from Chicago
Chicago Cardinals players
American football offensive guards
Marquette Golden Avalanche football players
Marquette University alumni
John Marshall Law School (Chicago) alumni
Judges of the Circuit Court of Cook County
Democratic Party members of the Illinois House of Representatives
20th-century American judges
20th-century American politicians